2006 floods could refer to a number of flooding incidents in 2006: 

Mid-Atlantic United States flood of 2006
2006 European floods
2006-07 Southeast Asian floods
2006-2007 Malaysian floods
2006 North Korea flooding
Southwest floods of 2006

See also
Weather in 2006 for an overview
List of notable floods
Floods in the United States: 2001-present